Yartsevo is the name of several inhabited localities in Russia.

Urban localities
Yartsevo, Smolensk Oblast, a town in Yartsevsky District of Smolensk Oblast; administratively incorporated as Yartsevskoye Urban Settlement

Rural localities
Yartsevo, Bryansk Oblast, a selo in Zapolskokhaleyevichsky Selsoviet of Starodubsky District of Bryansk Oblast
Yartsevo, Ivanovo Oblast, a village in Yuryevetsky District of Ivanovo Oblast
Yartsevo, Kaluga Oblast, a village in Dzerzhinsky District of Kaluga Oblast
Yartsevo, Kirov Oblast, a village under the administrative jurisdiction of the urban-type settlement of Lalsk in Luzsky District of Kirov Oblast
Yartsevo, Kostroma Oblast, a village in Knyazhevskoye Settlement of Makaryevsky District of Kostroma Oblast
Yartsevo, Krasnoyarsk Krai, a selo in Yartsevsky Selsoviet of Yeniseysky District of Krasnoyarsk Krai
Yartsevo, Moscow, a village in Mikhaylovo-Yartsevskoye Settlement of Moscow
Yartsevo, Dmitrovsky District, Moscow Oblast, a village under the administrative jurisdiction of the Town of Yakhroma in Dmitrovsky District of Moscow Oblast
Yartsevo, Stupinsky District, Moscow Oblast, a village in Aksinyinskoye Rural Settlement of Stupinsky District of Moscow Oblast
Yartsevo, Nizhny Novgorod Oblast, a village in Bolsheokulovsky Selsoviet of Navashinsky District of Nizhny Novgorod Oblast
Yartsevo, Lyubytinsky District, Novgorod Oblast, a village under the administrative jurisdiction of the urban-type settlement of Lyubytino in Lyubytinsky District of Novgorod Oblast
Yartsevo, Parfinsky District, Novgorod Oblast, a village in Polavskoye Settlement of Parfinsky District of Novgorod Oblast
Yartsevo, Novosokolnichesky District, Pskov Oblast, a village in Novosokolnichesky District, Pskov Oblast
Yartsevo, Opochetsky District, Pskov Oblast, a village in Opochetsky District, Pskov Oblast
Yartsevo, Palkinsky District, Pskov Oblast, a village in Palkinsky District, Pskov Oblast
Yartsevo, Tula Oblast, a village in Krapivenskaya Rural Administration of Shchyokinsky District of Tula Oblast
Yartsevo, Tver Oblast, a village in Toporovskoye Rural Settlement of Sandovsky District of Tver Oblast
Yartsevo, Vladimir Oblast, a village in Selivanovsky District of Vladimir Oblast
Yartsevo, Babayevsky District, Vologda Oblast, a village in Toropovsky Selsoviet of Babayevsky District of Vologda Oblast
Yartsevo, Cherepovetsky District, Vologda Oblast, a village in Abakanovsky Selsoviet of Cherepovetsky District of Vologda Oblast
Yartsevo, Totemsky District, Vologda Oblast, a village in Vozhbalsky Selsoviet of Totemsky District of Vologda Oblast
Yartsevo, Soshnevsky Selsoviet, Ustyuzhensky District, Vologda Oblast, a village in Soshnevsky Selsoviet of Ustyuzhensky District of Vologda Oblast
Yartsevo, Zalessky Selsoviet, Ustyuzhensky District, Vologda Oblast, a village in Zalessky Selsoviet of Ustyuzhensky District of Vologda Oblast
Yartsevo, Vozhegodsky District, Vologda Oblast, a village in Vozhegodsky Selsoviet of Vozhegodsky District of Vologda Oblast
Yartsevo, Nekouzsky District, Yaroslavl Oblast, a village in Spassky Rural Okrug of Nekouzsky District of Yaroslavl Oblast
Yartsevo, Yaroslavsky District, Yaroslavl Oblast, a village in Tunoshensky Rural Okrug of Yaroslavsky District of Yaroslavl Oblast